MS Finlandia is a cruiseferry owned and operated by the Finnish ferry operator Eckerö Line. The ship operates between Tallinn and Helsinki.

History
Finlandia was renovated at a drydock in Gdansk, Poland in early 2019.

Sister ships
The Finlandia is the second of three identical ships built by DSME and Fincantieri. The other two ships are Moby Wonder and Moby Aki. Tallink’s Superstar is also considered a sister ship, but the two ships are not identical.

References

Ferries of Finland
2000 ships
Ships built by Daewoo Shipbuilding & Marine Engineering